Information and communication technologies for environmental sustainability (ICT Ensure) is a general term referring to the application of information and communication technologies (ICTs) within the field of environmental sustainability. Information and communication technologies are acting as integrating and enabling technologies for the economy and they profoundly affect our society. Recent changes in ICT use globally have damaged the environment (in terms of waste and energy consumption etc.) but also have the potential to support environmental sustainability activities, such as the targets set within the Millennium Development Goal (MDG) number 7 (MDG7) to "ensure environmental sustainability".

New technologies provide utilities for knowledge acquisition and awareness, early evaluation of new knowledge, reaching agreements and communication of progress in the interest of the human welfare. This includes ethical aspects of protecting human life as well as aspects of consumer safety and the preservation of our natural environment.

Application areas
More and more application areas are becoming relevant to sustainable development in industry, health care, agriculture and the information society, and they affect the perspectives of ICT, the environment, policy and science. More and more interest has been emerged as well to risk and disaster management, adaptation to climate change and resource use.

 ICT in Energy Consumption/Efficiency
 ICT in Climate Change
 ICT and Sustainable Use of Natural Resources
 ICT for Biodiversity
 Eco-industrial Applications and ICT for Industrial Ecology
 ICT in Agriculture
 ICT for Landscape Ecology
 Personal Information Systems and Quality of Life
 ICT for Sustainable Urban Development
 ICT in Health Care
 ICT for Environmental Risk Management

See also
 Agriculture
 Biodiversity
 Climate change
 Natural resource management
 Quality of life
 Information Age
 Infocommunications

References

Further reading
 Millennium Development Goals | Goal 7: Ensure environmental sustainability
 SMART 2020 Report
 ICTs: Do They Contribute to Increased Carbon Emissions?
 New and Emergent ICTs and Climate Change in Developing Countries

Environmental

Environmental communication